The third season of CSI: Miami premiered on CBS on September 20, 2004. The season finale aired on May 23, 2005. The series stars David Caruso and Emily Procter.

Plot 
Entering their third season, the Miami CSIs continue to work to rid the streets of crime using state-of-the-art scientific techniques and back-to-basics police work. The team suffers a personal loss this season as Tim Speedle is gunned down while investigating a murder/kidnapping. Horatio hires Ryan Wolfe, a patrol officer with Obsessive Compulsive tendencies, to round out their investigative squad. Facing their most explosive season yet, the team investigate piracy, car-jacking, gun-play, homicides involving snakes, and a tsunami.

Cast

Changes 
Rory Cochrane left the series after the season premiere. Jonathan Togo joined the show and was promoted to series regular. Rex Linn became a new recurring cast member.

Main cast 
 David Caruso as Horatio Caine; a CSI Lieutenant and the Director of the MDPD Crime Lab.
 Emily Procter as Calleigh Duquesne; a veteran CSI Detective, the CSI Assistant Supervisor and a ballistics expert.
 Adam Rodriguez as Eric Delko; a CSI Detective and Wolfe's partner.
 Sofia Milos as Yelina Salas; an MDPD Robbery-Homicide Division (RHD) Detective assigned to assist the CSIs.
 Khandi Alexander as Alexx Woods; a Medical Examiner assigned to CSI.
 Rory Cochrane as Tim Speedle; a CSI Detective and Delko's partner. (Episode 1)
 Jonathan Togo as Ryan Wolfe; a newly hired CSI Detective and Delko's partner. (Episodes 3-24)

Recurring 
 Rex Linn as Frank Tripp; a senior Robbery-Homicide Division (RHD) Detective assigned to assist the CSI's.
 Holt McCallany as John Hagen; a senior MDPD Robbery-Homicide Division (RHD) Detective assigned to assist the CSI's.
David Lee Smith as Rick Stetler; an IAB officer.

Episodes
Episodes 7 and 16 have a net running time of 63 minutes.

References

External links
 DVD Release Dates at TVShowsOnDVD.com.

03
2004 American television seasons
2005 American television seasons